Rob Butler (born 15 May 1998) is an English professional rugby league footballer who plays as a  forward for Wakefield Trinity in the Super League and the England Knights at international level.

He has previously played for the London Broncos in the Betfred Championship and Warrington Wolves the Super League, and has spent time on loan from the Broncos at the London Skolars and the Coventry Bears in League 1.
It is rumoured Rob has signed a deal to play for relegation favourites Wakefield Trinity in the Superleague.

Background
Butler was born in Rochester, Kent, England and was a player at Medway Dragons RLFC for nine years as a junior.

Career

London Broncos
In 2018 Butler made his professional debut for the London Broncos against the Toronto Wolfpack in Round 4 of the Championship.

Warrington Wolves
On 24 November 2020 it was announced that Butler had signed for the Warrington Wolves on a 2-year deal.

Leigh Centurions (loan)
On 8 Jul 2021 it was reported that he had signed for the Leigh Centurions in the Super League on loan.

International career
He was called up to the England Knights training squad in July 2019.

In 2019 he made his international debut for the England Knights against Jamaica at Headingley Rugby Stadium.

References

External links

Warrington Wolves profile
London Broncos profile
SL profile

1998 births
Living people
Coventry Bears players
England Knights national rugby league team players
English rugby league players
Leigh Leopards players
London Broncos players
London Skolars players
Rugby league players from Kent
Rugby league props
Wakefield Trinity players
Warrington Wolves players